Open Het Dorp ("Open The Village") was the first big fundraising TV show in the Netherlands. It aired on Dutch TV on 26 and 27 November 1962.

Het Dorp is a special village or community for disabled people. To raise the required funds to build and open the community, a TV show was organized.

The program was at that moment the first nationwide fundraising TV show, and it was done in the format of a telethon, lasting for 23 hours. Mies Bouwman entirely presented it. Most local corner-shops cooperated: viewers could donate by putting cash in a small box (matchbox) and bring it to the local shop: most shops opened their doors on the evening of 26 November; the show was aired on TV and radio simultaneously as large numbers of people did not own a TV at that time.

The director of the TV show was Theo Orderman. During the show, over 400 artists and other VIPs appeared in the show.

After 23 hours of fundraising, a total amount of 21 million guilders was collected, which was used to open Het Dorp near the city of Arnhem.

In the archives only short fragments are available regarding this event.

References

Telethons
1962 television specials
Dutch television shows
1960s in Dutch television
Dutch-language television shows
1962 Dutch television series debuts
1962 Dutch television series endings
1962 in the Netherlands
Black-and-white Dutch television shows